Old Pentland Cemetery is a cemetery in Old Pentland, near Loanhead in Midlothian, Scotland. A category B listed building, the cemetery dates back to the early 17th century.

The cemetery contains the remains of members of the Covenanter movement who died during the Battle of Rullion Green in 1666. The Gibsone burial vault was built in 1839 to designs by the architect Thomas Hamilton, and there is an 18th-century watch house, used to guard against body snatchers. There are several medieval cross-slabs in the cemetery.

The burial ground is on the site of Pentland parish church, which was established in the 13th century, and was still in use in 1907, although the parish had been joined with Lasswade in the 17th century.

References

External links
 Doors open all over Midlothian
 Photos of Old Pentland Cemetery
 Old Pentland, Damhead Community Council website

Cemeteries in Scotland
Category B listed buildings in Midlothian
17th-century establishments in Scotland
History of Midlothian